Fabiula Nascimento (born 18 August 1978) is a Brazilian actress. Born in Curitiba, her first major film role was in Estômago, while her most known role came with TV Globo's telenovela Avenida Brasil.

Filmography

Television 
2008: Casos e Acasos - Susy/Lúcia
2009: A Grande Família - Fátima
2009–2011: Força-Tarefa - Jaqueline 
2011: Tapas & Beijos - Samantha
2012: Avenida Brasil - Olenka
2013: O Canto da Sereia - Marina de Ogum
2013: Joia Rara - Matilde Meyer
2014: Boogie Oogie - Cristina
2015: I Love Paraisópolis - Paulucha
2018: Segundo Sol - Cacau
2019: Bom Sucesso - Mariana Prado Monteiro Cabral (Nana)

Films 
2005: Sem Ana - Adriana 
2007: Brichos
2007: Estômago - Íria
2010: Reflexões de um Liquidificador - Milena
2010: Não Se Pode Viver sem Amor - Gilda/Cida
2011: Bruna Surfistinha - Janine
2011: Amor? - Julia
2011: Cilada.com - Suzy
2012: Brichos – A Floresta é Nossa
2013: A Wolf at the Door
2014: The Pilgrim - Lygia Souza
2014: S.O.S. Mulheres ao Mar - Luiza

References

External links

1978 births
Actresses from Curitiba
20th-century Brazilian actresses
21st-century Brazilian actresses
Brazilian film actresses
Brazilian stage actresses
Brazilian television actresses
Living people